Reicheocactus, is a monotypic genus of cactus in the family Cactaceae, native to north western Argentina. It has only one known species; Reicheocactus famatimensis 

It is usually solitary or slowly clumping and slow growing. The stems are small flattened-roundish to cylindrical with very short spidery-pectinate spines and egg-yellow flowers.

The species grows at elevations of  metres above sea level.
It is found in high altitude grasslands on rocky soils. The species is not common or abundant, however it is difficult to see because of its small size. The major threat for the species is over collection (by plant collectors). The potential development of mining in its natural habitat could affect the populations of the species in the near future.

The genus Reicheocactus was published in Cactaceae (Berlin) 1941(2) on page 76 (published in 1942), and the species was published in Cactaceae Syst. Init. vol.28 on page 30 in 2012.

It was once thought to be a synonym of Rebutia,
and commonly found in cactus nurseries as Lobivia famatimensis.

The genus name of Reicheocactus is in honour of Karl Friedrich Reiche (1860-1929), who was a German botanist who worked as a university professor in Chile and Mexico. The Latin specific epithet of famatimensis is derived from Sierra de Famatina, a mountain range and massif in the Andes of the Argentine province of La Rioja.

References

Other sources
 Urs Eggli, Leonard E. Newton "Etymological Dictionary of Succulent Plant Names". Springer, Berlin/Heidelberg 2010

Cactoideae
Flora of Northwest Argentina
Plants described in 1941
Cactoideae genera
Monotypic Cactaceae genera